The Infiniti QX30 is a subcompact luxury crossover SUV manufactured and marketed by Nissan's Infiniti luxury brand. It is heavily based on the Q30 hatchback with modifications mainly in its ride height in order to be marketed as a crossover. Both the Q30 and the QX30 are based on the first-generation Mercedes-Benz GLA and the third-generation Mercedes-Benz A-Class. The QX30 was manufactured from 2016 to mid-2019, at the same time the brand withdrew from Europe altogether.

Concept model 
The QX30 Concept featured 21-inch wheels, large tires, and increased blackout around the wheel opening, with a satin chrome front bumper. It was introduced at the 2015 Geneva International Motor Show, followed by the 2015 New York International Auto Show.

Production model 

Based on the Infiniti Q30, the QX30 includes redesigned front and rear bumpers, grained side sills, as well as bodywork finished with satin chrome plated inserts with metallic finish along with an increased ride height. The QX30 was unveiled at the 2015 Los Angeles Motor Show and the 2015 Auto Guangzhou, followed by the 2016 Geneva Motor Show.

US and Canada models went on sale in the middle of 2016 as model year 2017 vehicles, with a 2.0 litre turbocharged four cylinder engine with 7-speed dual-clutch automatic transmission, followed by Mexico and Latin America in the second half of 2016.

European models went on sale in the summer of 2016. Early models included 2.2d AWD with 7-speed dual-clutch transmission.

Engines

Production 
The QX30 was assembled in Sunderland, United Kingdom, with the engines assembled in Germany.

Marketing 
As part of QX30 launch in the United Kingdom, a QX30 with 48,000 copper tacks adhered to half of the QX30's bodywork was unveiled in the 2016 London Art Fair at the Islington Business Center.

References

External links 
 2017 Infiniti QX30 press kit (US)
 

Cars introduced in 2016
QX30
Mini sport utility vehicles
Luxury crossover sport utility vehicles
Front-wheel-drive vehicles
All-wheel-drive vehicles